Cahto is a former settlement in Mendocino County, California.

Cahto was founded by John P. Simpson and Robert White in 1856. They built a hotel there in 1861, and a store in 1865. A post office operated at Cahto from 1863 to 1901. The Independent Order of Odd Fellows maintained Cahto Lodge No. 206 in the town as well, which met in a two-story hall constructed in 1872 that doubled as a public hall and meeting place.

"Cahto" means "lake" in the language of the local Pomo people.

References

Former settlements in Mendocino County, California
Former populated places in California
Populated places established in 1856
1856 establishments in California